Mohamed Hashi Dhamac (1949 – 30 September 2012) better known as Gaarriye, was a Somali poet and political activist. He belonged to the Sa'ad Musa sub-division of the Habr Awal Isaaq clan.

Biography
Gaariye was born in Hargeisa in 1949 in former British Somaliland. He finished his elementary and secondary studies in Hargeisa in the early 1970s. and for University studies he enrolled in the Somali National University College in Afgooye and took the degree in bachelor of science in 1974.  Known as a sharp critic, he would start the famous Deelley poetic chain in response to repression in Somalia under Siad Barre's rule. Other famous poets such as Hadrawi would contribute to Deelley. He was a member of the Somali National Movement and following the Somali Civil War he composed one of the best known Somali poems on the theme of reconciliation, "Hagarlaawe" (The Charitable) which is translated into English by Martin Orwin. In the 1970s Gaariye independently discovered the Somali prosodic system around the same time as fellow literary scholar Abdillahi Diiriye Guled.

Gaarriye died at a hospital in Norway on 30 September 2012.

Poetry
Gaariye worked closely with British linguist Martin Orwin in the later years of his life to transcribe and translate many of his best poems into English. His translated poems were published post humously alongside Hadraawi's and some other prominent contemporary Somali poets in a 2018 biography of Gaariye.

Works
 Maxamed Xaashi Dhamac (2013). Hagarlaawe : diiwaanka maansooyinka. Hargesya : Sagalet. .
 Maxamed Xaashi Dhamac, Jama Musse Jama (ed.) (2012). Maxamed Xaashi Dhamac "Gaarriye" : biography and poems. Pisa :  Ponte Invisibile. .

See also
Hadraawi
Elmi Boodhari
Abdillahi Suldaan Mohammed Timacade
Somali literature

References

Further reading
 Yuusuf Cismaan Cabdile (2016). Diiwaanka siinley : silsiladdii ay kacaanka isa seegeen. Hargeysa, Somaliland : Sagajet Publications. .
 Cabdiraxmaan C. Faarax (2015). Mahadho : Sooyaalkii iyo Waxqabadkii Maxamed Xaashi Dhamac 'Gaarriye' (1949-2012). [Sweden] : Hal-aqoon Publishers. .
 Boobe Yuusuf Ducaale (2013). Ilmadii hal-abuurka : Maqaallo iyo maansooyin loogu baroor-diiqay : Macallin Maxamed Xaashi Dhamac (Gaarriye), 1952kii-2012ka. Hargeysa : Bobe Publications. .

1949 births
2012 deaths
Somaliland poets
Somalian Muslims
People from Hargeisa
20th-century Somalian people
20th-century poets